Sephiri Enoch Montanyane (born in 1939) is a Lesotho politician. He served as the Speaker of the National Assembly of Lesotho from June 2017 to October 2022 in lower chamber of the Lesotho Parliament. Montanyane was formerly a Minister in the Prime Minister's office. He was first elected to the National Assembly from Malimabatso constituency in the 1965 elections. He was the minister of justice in 1990s.

References

Living people
1939 births
Speakers of the National Assembly (Lesotho)
Members of the National Assembly (Lesotho)
Government ministers of Lesotho
Place of birth missing (living people)
Date of birth missing (living people)